Rigoberto Mendoza Pérez (born January 4, 1946) is a retired male marathon runner from Cuba. He won the gold medal at the 1975 Pan American Games and competed for his native country at the 1976 Summer Olympics, finishing in 33rd place. He set his personal best (2:21.01) in the classic distance in 1975.

Achievements

References
 sports-reference

1946 births
Living people
Cuban male long-distance runners
Cuban male marathon runners
Olympic athletes of Cuba
Athletes (track and field) at the 1975 Pan American Games
Athletes (track and field) at the 1976 Summer Olympics
Pan American Games gold medalists for Cuba
Pan American Games medalists in athletics (track and field)
Medalists at the 1975 Pan American Games
Central American and Caribbean Games medalists in athletics